The Villa d'Este, originally Villa del Garovo, is a Renaissance patrician residence in Cernobbio on the shores of Lake Como in northern Italy. Both the villa and the  park which surrounds it have undergone significant changes since their sixteenth-century origins as a summer residence for the Cardinal of Como. Nevertheless, visiting the garden in 1903 for Century Magazine, Edith Wharton found this to be ‘the only old garden on Como which keeps more than a fragment of its original architecture’, and noted that ‘though Queen Caroline anglicised part of the grounds, the main lines of the Renaissance garden still exist’. Since 1873, the complex has been a luxury hotel.

History
Gerardo Landriani, Bishop of Como (1437–1445), founded a female convent here at the mouth of the Garovo torrent in 1442. A century later, Cardinal Tolomeo Gallio demolished the nunnery and commissioned Pellegrino Tibaldi to design a residence for his own use. The Villa del Garovo, together with its luxuriant gardens, was constructed during the years 1565–70 and during the cardinal’s lifetime it became a resort of politicians, intellectuals and ecclesiastics. On Gallio’s death, the villa passed to his family who, over the years, allowed it to sink into a state of some decay.

From 1749 to 1769, it was a Jesuit centre for spiritual exercises, after which it was acquired first by Count Mario Odescalchi and then in 1778 by a Count Marliani. In 1784, it passed to the Milanese Calderari family, who undertook a major restoration project and created a new park all’Italiana, with an impressive nymphaeum and a temple displaying a seventeenth-century statue of Hercules hurling Lichas into the sea. After the death of Marquis Calderari, his wife Vittoria Peluso, a former ballerina at La Scala and known as la Pelusina, married a Napoleonic general, Count Domenico Pino, and a mock fortress was erected in the park in his honour.

In 1815, it became the residence of Caroline of Brunswick, estranged wife of future King George IV. "Its garden seems almost suspended in the air", she wrote in her diary, "and forms a scene of complete enchantment."<ref>Edgcumbe Staley, [https://archive.org/details/lordsladiesofita00stal Lords and Ladies of the Italian Lakes] (London: John Long, 1912), p. 118.</ref> She gave it the name Nuova Villa d'Este and had the park landscaped in the English style.Macadam, Alta (1997). Blue Guide Northern Italy. A & C Black. . p. 111. 

It was converted into a deluxe hotel for the nobility and the high bourgeoisie in 1873, and kept the name Villa d'Este to take advantage of the apparent link with the famous Villa d'Este in Tivoli, near Rome. In 1925 Alfred Hitchcock turned his movie The Pleasure Garden on the premises of the hotel. A gala dinner held at the Villa d’Este in 1948 was the scene for the celebrated murder of the wealthy silk manufacturer Carlo Sacchi, shot dead by his lover Countess Pia Bellentani with her husband’s Fegyverzyar automatic pistol.Italy: Form Letter, Time, 17 March 1952.

Present
Today, with room rates averaging €1000 ($1200) a night and top suites averaging €3500 ($4200) per night, the villa is a luxury hotel for wealthy people and a high-level congress center.

In June 2009, Forbes reckoned it the best hotel in the world, while in 2014 it was listed as the 2nd best resort in Europe by Travel + Leisure'' magazine.

Every May, the hotel holds a Concours d'Elegance for vintage and concept cars, the Concorso d'Eleganza Villa d'Este, which was first presented in 1928. In September, it hosts the annual Ambrosetti Forum, an international workshop attended by prominent figures from the fields of politics, finance and business, which has taken place there since 1975.

Notes

Further reading

External links

 
 Edgcumbe Staley, Lords and Ladies of the Italian Lakes (London: John Long, 1912), pp. 116–129.

Hotels in Italy
Houses completed in 1570
1570 establishments in Italy
Renaissance architecture in Lombardy
Este
Cernobbio
Caroline of Brunswick